Dirk Wouter Johannes "Dick" van Dijk (15 February 1946 – 8 July 1997) was a Dutch professional footballer who played for FC Twente and Ajax Amsterdam. He was a member of Ajax's European Cup victory in 1971. He earned seven caps for the Netherlands national football team.

Club career
Dick van Dijk grew up in Gouda and played football in his youth in the local amateur club. When he was sixteen, he met coach Hans Croon of SVV, with whom he played in the Second division. Van Dijk was the top scorer for the club in 1966 when SVV won promotion to the First Division. He was invited to the Dutch youth team and the Dutch military team. The scoring ability of the young star attracted the interest of FC Twente, but the asking price of 200,000 guilders was too much. A less impressive season ensured that the transfer fee a year later had dropped to 70,000 guilders, with Van Dijk joining FC Twente in the summer of 1967.

At Twente, Van Dijk formed a strong attacking partnership with Theo Pahlplatz, scoring 22 times and helping a youthful side to a creditable eighth-place finish in his first season. The following year Van Dijk finished as  top scorer in the Premier League with 30 goals. In a legendary home match against Ajax on 3 November 1968, Twente won 5–1 and Van Dijk scored three goals. It is believed that this contest sparked the interest of Ajax in Van Dijk, who in June 1969 moved to Amsterdam for a transfer fee of 750,000 guilders.

While Van Dijk had been a star player at Twente, he had to fight for a spot at Ajax, becoming as a result a more complete footballer who knew how to defend. In his first season, he scored 23 goals in 32 matches. Although not a regular starter during his second season, he nonetheless scored 18 goals in 29 matches. Van Dijk started in the final of the European Cup in June 1971 against Panathinaikos, scoring with a header after five minutes in Ajax's 2–0 victory.

After a third season at Ajax, where he was mainly a reserve player, Van Dijk departed in 1972 to OGC Nice in France. There he scored frequently, helping the team to a second-place finish in 1972–73 season. On 19 September 1973, Nice achieved a remarkable 3–0 victory in the first leg of their UEFA Cup tie with  FC Barcelona, whose coach was Dutchman Rinus Michels and whose star player (although he did not figure in the match) was Johan Cruijff. (Nice would go on to win the tie 3–2 on aggregate.) In 1974, Van Dijk joined Real Murcia in Spain, and a year later ended his football career.

International career
Meanwhile, Van Dijk had made his international debut on 26 March 1969 in a match for the Dutch national team against Luxembourg. Van Dijk scored once in a 4–0 victory.

On 10 October 1971 Van Dijk played his seventh and final international match against East Germany.

Personal life
He was married to Wanda Kerbaum. After his playing career, he went back to Nice, working as a broker and living in nearby Saint-Paul-de-Vence.

Death
In 1997, he died suddenly at 51 years of age from acute endocarditis, a bacterial infection of the heart valves. In his memory, a benefit match was organized on 12 October 1997 between ONA Gouda and the Ajax of the Europe Cup I-finals from 1971. In May 2017, 20 years after his death, another matched was staged in his memory between former Ajax players and Nice.

Honours

Club
Ajax
Eredivisie: 1969–70, 1971–72
KNVB Cup: 1966–67, 1969–70, 1970–71, 1971–72
European Cup: 1970–71, 1971–72

Individual
Eredivisie top scorer: 1968–69

References

External links
 
 Obituary - NRC 
 Dick van Dijk at Voetbal International 
 

1946 births
1997 deaths
Footballers from Gouda, South Holland
Association football forwards
Dutch footballers
Netherlands international footballers
SV SVV players
FC Twente players
AFC Ajax players
OGC Nice players
Real Murcia players
Eredivisie players
Ligue 1 players
La Liga players
Dutch expatriate footballers
Dutch expatriate sportspeople in France
Dutch expatriate sportspeople in Spain
Expatriate footballers in France
Expatriate footballers in Spain
Infectious disease deaths in France
UEFA Champions League winning players